Antoni Listowski (29 March 1865, Warsaw - 13 September 1927, Warsaw) was a Polish military officer. After being a mayor general of the Imperial Russian Army (from 1916 on), he became general in the Polish Armed Forces and took part in the Polish-Soviet War.

General Antoni Listowski won the battle for Pinsk in March 1919 commanding the 9th Infantry Division. The city was taken over in a late-winter blizzard with considerable human losses sustained by his 34th Infantry Regiment who forced the Bolsheviks to retreat to the other side of the river.

On 5 April 1919, Listowski's troops committed the Pinsk massacre, executing thirty five suspected pro-Bolshevik Jews. In his order to the population of Pinsk of 7 April 1919, two days after the massacre, Listowski justified the massacre as the "town's Jews as a whole were guilty of the crime of blatant ingratitude".

References

1865 births
1927 deaths
Military personnel from Warsaw
People from Warsaw Governorate
Polish generals of the Second Polish Republic
Polish generals in the Imperial Russian Army
Russian military personnel of the Russo-Japanese War
Russian military personnel of World War I
Polish people of the Polish–Soviet War
Polish mass murderers
Recipients of the Order of St. Anna, 2nd class
Recipients of the Order of St. Anna, 3rd class
Recipients of the Order of Saint Stanislaus (Russian), 2nd class
Recipients of the Order of Saint Stanislaus (Russian), 3rd class
Recipients of the Order of St. Vladimir, 3rd class
Recipients of the Order of St. Vladimir, 4th class
Knights of the Virtuti Militari
War criminals